Osvaldo Sánchez (born 9 January 1911, date of death unknown) was a Chilean boxer. He competed in the men's bantamweight event at the 1928 Summer Olympics.

References

External links
 

1911 births
Year of death missing
Chilean male boxers
Olympic boxers of Chile
Boxers at the 1928 Summer Olympics
Place of birth missing
Bantamweight boxers
20th-century Chilean people